Eupinivora angulicosta is a species of moth of the family Tortricidae. It is found in Nuevo León, Mexico.

The length of the forewings is about 12 mm. The basal part of the forewings is orange, but slightly lighter along the dorsum. The lower portion of the discal cell has a white longitudinal blotch. The hindwings are pale grey.

Etymology
The species name refers to the distinctly angled costa of the valva in the male genitalia.

References

Moths described in 2013
Cochylini